Diplospinus multistriatus, the Striped escolar, is a species of snake mackerel of cosmopolitan distribution at depths of from .  This species grows to a length of  SL though most do not exceed  SL.  This species is important as a food fish to local populations.  This species is the only known member of its genus.

References

Gempylidae
Monotypic fish genera
Fish described in 1948